The Wallowa Ranger Station at 602 W. 1st St. in Wallowa, Oregon is a historic station built in 1936.  It was listed on the National Register of Historic Places in 2009;  the listing included five contributing buildings.  It includes Late 19th and Early 20th Century American Movements architecture and Rustic architecture designed by U.S. Forest Service architects.

References 

National Register of Historic Places in Wallowa County, Oregon
Late 19th and Early 20th Century American Movements architecture
Buildings and structures completed in 1936
Buildings and structures in Wallowa County, Oregon
Historic districts on the National Register of Historic Places in Oregon